Bernard "Tut" Bartzen (November 25, 1927 - July 10, 2019) was an American former tennis player in the mid-20th century, who later became a winning college tennis coach.

Biography
Born in 1927 in Austin, Texas, Bartzen moved with his family to San Angelo when he was 5 years old. He won three Texas state high school titles — two in singles and one in doubles — and the National Interscholastic singles championship.

Bartzen attended the College of William & Mary, where the left-hander posted a 50–0 singles record. He also won the NCAA doubles title with Fred Kovaleski in 1948.

Bartzen went on the American tennis circuit and was ranked in the top 10 nine straight years (1953–1961), two of them at No. 2 (1959 and 1960). Lance Tingay of The Daily Telegraph ranked him World No. 8 for 1959. During his career, he had wins over such future Hall of Famers as Vic Seixas and Tony Trabert. One of those wins over Trabert came in 1955 in the final at the event in Cincinnati, where Bartzen won three titles: 1955, 1957 and 1958. Bartzen reached the semifinals of the U.S. National Championships in 1959 (beating Vic Seixas before losing to Neale Fraser) and the quarterfinals in 1955. He also won four U.S. Clay Court Championships and won the Canadian National title in 1954.  He served as co-captain of the U.S. Davis Cup team and won 15 singles matches.

After his playing career, Bartzen served 12 years as head tennis pro at Colonial Country Club in Fort Worth, Texas, where he hosted the Colonial National Invitational Tournament, before taking over the Texas Christian University program in 1974. His tennis teams were ranked nationally every year but one in a 20-year stretch.  

Bartzen was inducted into the Texas Sports Hall of Fame in 1995.

Bernard James "Tut" Bartzen died on July 10, 2019, 19 years to the day after his wife, Sara Jane Ledbetter.

References

External links
 
 
 
 "Tut" Bartzen profile in College Tennis Online.
 Division I Men's Tennis All-Time Doubles Champions: 1940s

1927 births
2019 deaths
American male tennis players
American tennis coaches
Tennis players from Austin, Texas
Sportspeople from Fort Worth, Texas
TCU Horned Frogs men's tennis coaches
William & Mary Tribe men's tennis players